Aswan International Women's Film Festival (AIWFF) was founded in 2017 by Egyptian screenwriter Mohamed Abdel Khalek. It is the first festival geared towards teaching filmmaking to youth in the Aswan region.

History 
The festival, established in 2017 by Mohamed Abdel Khalek, has quickly become one of Egypt's premier film events. It is conducted in coordination between the Egyptian ministries of culture and tourism, under the supervision of the National Council for Women. The festival attracts an international audience of celebrities and politicians from the Arab world and beyond, such as Yosra El Lozy, Madeleine Tabar, Randa El Behery, Danny Glover, Barbara Bouchet and others. The festival is dedicated to Algerian fighter Jamila Bouhaird, who attended a tribute in her honor at the 2nd edition in 2018. The 3rd edition of the festival, held February 20, 2019, honored the career of Mohsena Tawfik, veteran star of Egyptian film and television.

Over 125 students have been trained in festival workshops, producing several documentary films as graduation projects. In addition to screening over 30 films, the festival conducts seminars, a women's issues forum, a producer's salon (composed entirely of men) and celebratory events.

See also 
 List of women's film festivals

References

External links 
 
 

Women's film festivals
Annual events in Egypt
African film festivals
Winter events in Egypt
2017 establishments in Egypt
Film festivals established in 2017